Tingena tephrophanes is a species of moth in the family Oecophoridae. It is endemic to New Zealand and has been found at Mount Arthur. Adults of this species are on the wing in January.

Taxonomy 
This species was described by Edward Meyrick in 1929 using specimens collected by George Hudson in January in Flora Creek at Mount Arthur and named Borkhausenia tephrophanes. In 1939 George Hudson discussed and illustrated this species under this same name. In 1988 J. S. Dugdale placed this species in the genus Tingena. The female holotype specimen is held at the Natural History Museum, London.

Description

Meyrick first described this species as follows:
Similar in appearance to Tingena nycteris but can be distinguished as T. tephrophranes is a shiny leaden grey colour and has a tornal suffusion.

Distribution
This species is endemic to New Zealand and has been found at Mount Arthur.

Behaviour 
The adult of this species is on the wing in January.

Habitat 
This species inhabits subalpine native forests.

References

Oecophoridae
Moths of New Zealand
Moths described in 1929
Endemic fauna of New Zealand
Taxa named by Edward Meyrick
Endemic moths of New Zealand